Pragyan Sundar Gogoi (born 25 January 1999) is an Indian professional footballer who plays as a Central midfielder for Indian Super League club NorthEast United.

Career 
Born in Sivasagar, Assam, Pragyan Gogoi started his football career with Shillong Lajong U18 and then moved to Kerala Blasters U-18. He also captained Kerala Blasters U-18 to the final of 2017–18 Youth League U18. He was then promoted to the Kerala Blasters Reserves to play in I-League 2nd Division. During 2019–20 Kerala Premier League season, He captained Kerala Blasters Reserves to their first ever Kerala Premier League title.

NorthEast United 

On 15 October 2020, Pragyan Gogoi joined NorthEast United on a three-year deal. He made his debut for the club on 30 January 2021 against Mumbai City FC. He came on as 92nd minute substitute for Federico Gallego as NorthEast United won game for 2–1.

Personal life
Gogoi hails from Assam’s Nazira, a town situated in the district of Sivasagar. His younger brother Parthib Gogoi is also a professional footballer.

Career statistics

Club

References

Indian footballers
1999 births
Living people
People from Sivasagar
Footballers from Assam
Association football midfielders
I-League 2nd Division players
Indian Super League players
NorthEast United FC players
Kerala Blasters FC Reserves and Academy players